Red Blood, Yellow Gold (also known as Professionals for a Massacre), is a 1967 Italian-Spanish Spaghetti Western film directed by Nando Cicero.

Cast 
 George Hilton: Steel Downey
 Edd Byrnes: Chattanooga Jim 
 George Martin: Fidel Ramirez 
 Milo Quesada: Lieutenant Logan 
 Mónica Randall: Annie 
 Gérard Herter: Major Lloyd 
 José Bódalo: Pietro Primero 
 Gisella Monaldi:  Luisa
 Carlo Gentili: General Sibley

Plot
Confederate Major Lloyd and some accomplices desert with a Gatling gun and a shipment of gold. General Sibley sends Lt. Tennessee Logan, together with three Confederate soldiers about to be executed for theft – horse-thief Ramirez, defrocked priest and dynamite expert Steel Downey, and bank robber Chattanooga Jim.  They set up an ambush for Lloyd, but the three others ditch Logan and go for the gold, only to find it snatched by the Mexican Camiseros gang. They ally with Lloyd against the Camiseros and then blow up Lloyd and his men, only to be intercepted by a Union troop led by Logan, who is a Union spy. The heroes manage to exterminate the Union men but are stopped by a Confederate troop led by General Sibley, who had suspected Logan but needed proof. The three are given horses and warned not to show themselves in these parts. When Sibley later hands over the gold to the Mexican army in exchange for weapons the three companions, now dressed in ponchos, suddenly drive off with the wagon, pursued by the Mexicans.

Reception
In his investigation of narrative structures in Spaghetti Western films, Fridlund compares Red Blood, Yellow Gold to other stories of multiple betrayals between protagonists for monetary reasons, inspired by The Good, the Bad and the Ugly, the main difference being that in this case the "hero" trio sticks together.

Releases
Wild East released this alongside Payment in Blood in an out-of-print limited edition R0 NTSC DVD in 2008.

References

External links

1967 films
1967 Western (genre) films
Films directed by Nando Cicero
Spaghetti Western films
American Civil War films
Films shot in Almería
1960s Italian-language films
1960s American films
1960s Italian films